Prince Herman Adolf of Solms-Lich-Hohensolms-Lich (15 April 1838 in Brtnice – 16 September 1899 in Lich, Hesse) was a German nobleman from the House of Solms-Hohensolms-Lich and a politician.

Life 
Hermann was the eldest son of Prince Ferdinand of Solms-Lich-Hohensolms (1806-1876) and his wife Caroline, Countess of Collalto and San Salvatore (1818-1855).

As a Hessian nobleman, Hermann of Solms-Lich-Hohensolms was a member of the first chamber of the Estates of the Grand Duchy of Hesse from 1872 to 1874 and from 1880 until his death in 1899.  From 1881 to 1899, he was also a member of the Prussian House of Lords.  He also was a member of the parliament of the Prussian Rhine province.

Marriage and issue 

He married in 1865 in Janowice Wielkie to Countess Agnes of Stolberg-Wernigerode (1842-1904), a daughter of Prussian General of the Cavalry Count Wilhelm zu Stolberg-Wernigerode. They had seven children:
 Charles (1866-1920), married Princess Emma zu Stolberg-Wernigerode, who succeeded him
 Reinhard Louis (1867-1951) married Countess Marka zu Solms-Sonnenwalde
 Anna Elizabeth (1868-1950) married Count Johannes zu Lynar
 Eleonore (1871-1937) married Ernest Louis, Grand Duke of Hesse
 Marie Mathilde (1873-1953) married Prince Ricahrd zu Dohna-Schlobitten
 Caroline (1877-1958) married Chlodwig, Landgrave of Hesse-Philippsthal-Barchfeld
 Dorothea (1883-1942) married Prince Hermann (1867–1913), son of Prince Otto of Stolberg-Wernigerode

Honours and awards 
 :
 Military Medical Cross, 8 May 1872
 Grand Cross of the Merit Order of Philip the Magnanimous, 3 March 1880
 Grand Cross of the Ludwig Order, 21 May 1885
  Kingdom of Prussia:
 Knight of Honour of the Johanniter Order, 1869; Knight of Justice, 1872
 Knight of the Order of the Prussian Crown, 3rd Class with Red Cross on Band, 8 August 1872
 Knight of the Order of the Red Eagle, 2nd Class with Star, 1 September 1884; 1st Class with Crown, 18 January 1893
  Mecklenburg: Grand Cross of the House Order of the Wendish Crown, with Crown in Ore

Literature 
 Jochen Lengemann: MdL Hessen 1808-1996, 1996, p. 361

References 

House of Solms-Hohensolms-Lich
House of Solms
German princes
1838 births
1899 deaths
19th-century German people
Members of the Prussian House of Lords
People from Brtnice